The 2001–02 Missouri Tigers men's basketball team represented the University of Missouri as a member of the Big 12 Conference during the 2001–02 NCAA men's basketball season. Led by third-year head coach Quin Snyder, the Tigers reached the Elite Eight of the NCAA tournament, and finished with an overall record of 24–12 (9–7 Big 12).

Roster

Schedule and results

 
|-
!colspan=9| Regular season

|-
!colspan=9| Big 12 Conference tournament

|-
!colspan=9| NCAA tournament

Rankings

Awards

References

Missouri
Missouri
Missouri Tigers men's basketball seasons